Laminaria is a genus of brown seaweed in the order Laminariales (kelp), comprising 31 species native to the north Atlantic and northern Pacific Oceans. This economically important genus is characterized by long, leathery laminae and relatively large size. Some species are called Devil's apron, due to their shape, or sea colander, due to the perforations present on the lamina. Others are referred to as tangle. Laminaria form a habitat for many fish and invertebrates.

The life cycle of Laminaria has heteromorphic alternation of generations which differs from Fucus. At meiosis the male and female zoospores are produced separately, then germinate into male and female gametophytes. The female egg matures in the oogonium until the male sperm fertilizes it. Life-Cycle: The most apparent form of Laminaria is its sporophyte phase, a structure composed of the holdfast, the stipe, and the blades. While it spends its time predominately in the sporophyte phase, it alternates between the sporophyte and its microscopic gametophyte phase.

Laminaria japonica (J. E. Areschoug – Japón)  is now regarded as a synonym of Saccharina japonica and Laminaria saccharina is now classified as Saccharina latissima.

History 
Laminaria arrived in China from Hokkaido, Japan in the late 1920s. Once in China, Laminaria was cultivated on a much larger industrial scale. The rocky shores at Dalian, the northern coast of the Yellow Sea, along with its cold waters provided excellent growing conditions for these species. Laminaria was harvested for food and 1949 yielded 40.3 metric tons of dry weight. Laminaria need cold water to survive and can only live above 36° N latitude.

In 1949, the Chinese started to commercially grow laminaria as a crop. This increased the production of dry weight to 6,200 metric tons. Farming laminaria is still a large production for China. However, since the 1980s production has dropped due to new mariculture technology .

Farming practices 
Laminaria is generally farmed using the floating raft method, in which young laminaria sporophytes are attached to submerged ropes. These ropes are then attached to floating rafts.

Ecology 
Laminaria is found in colder ocean waters, such as arctic regions. Preferring to stay in regions where there are rocky shores, this allows the laminaria to attach. Due to the height of the Laminaria, they provide protection for creatures that the open ocean does not often give. Invertebrates are just one of the organisms that live among the algae. Sea snails and other invertebrates feed on the blades (leaves) of the laminaria. Other organisms, such as sea urchins, feed on the holdfasts, which can kill the algae.  Red sea urchins, found on the North America Pacific Coast, can decimate kelp, including Laminaria, if the urchins are not managed by sea otters. Species such as Coelopa pilipes feed and lay eggs on Laminaria when it is washed up on beaches.

Life cycle 
Laminaria expresses a haplo-diplophasic life history, in which it alternates from a macroscopic thallic sporophyte structure, consisting of the holdfast, a stipe, and the blades, to a filamentous, microscopic gametophyte. On the other hand, the gametophyte structure is no more than a few millimeters in length. In opposition to the gametophyte phase, which only consists  of one type of tissue, the more complex sporophyte phase is made up of different types of tissue. One of these tissues includes a sieve-like element which translocates photoassimilates. These structures are very similar to mesophyll cells found in higher plant leaves.

Uses

Medical 
A laminaria stick may be used to slowly dilate the cervix to induce labor and delivery, or for surgical procedures including abortions or to facilitate the placement of an intrauterine device. The stick is made up of a bundle of dried and compressed laminaria that expands as water is absorbed.

Laminaria is a source of the relatively rare element, iodine, which is commonly used to promote thyroid health.

Certain carbohydrates such as mannitol, laminarin, and alginate can be extracted from laminaria. Mannitol is used to decrease high intraocular pressure, and to lower excessive intracranial pressure. Laminarin has two forms, soluble and insoluble. The soluble form of Laminarin has high antitumor activity, can be used in the treatment of antibiotic-resistant nosocomial infections, can aid in normalizing enteric metabolism, helps to improve enzymatic processes of the intestine and does not possess antigenic or pyrogenic properties. Laminarin continues to be of active study in today's medical field.

Food 
Various species of Laminaria have been used for food purposes since ancient times wherever humans have encountered them.  Typically, the prepared parts, usually the blade, are consumed either immediately after boiling in broth or water, or consumed after drying. The greater proportion of commercial cultivation is for algin, iodine, and mannitol, which are used in a range of industrial applications. In South Korea it is processed into a sweetmeat known as laminaria jelly, in other countries it is also used in fresh salad form, which is also canned for preservation for deliverу and selling purposes in other regions. Many countries produce and consume laminaria products, the largest being China.

Energy 
Due to their ability to grow underwater and in salt water, algae are being looked into as a source of biofuel. Laminaria is one of the five macroalgae farmed for products such as food, chemicals and power. Those five genera contribute to 76% of the total tonnage for farmed macroalgae. Laminaria is less desired as a renewable energy source due to its high ash content when burned. Laminaria has an ash content of 33%, while wood has about a 2% ash content when burned. Algae have a high water content requiring much energy to dry the algae before being able to properly use it.

More research is being done with anaerobic digestion, which is the most promising practice to extract energy from Laminaria. There are still barriers to overcome before moving forward with anaerobic digestion, such as its cost per kwh.

Metal absorption 
The ability of laminaria, along with other brown algae, to absorb heavy metals is a current area of interest regarding their use to remove heavy metals from wastewater. Laminaria has been shown by recent research to have a favorable mannuronic/guluronic acid residues ratio (M/G ratio) for heavy metal absorption in its alginate. This M/G ratio is the ratio between the L-gluronate (G) and D-mannuronate (M) in the alginate, a natural anionic polymer that is found in all brown algae.

Predator
Coelopa frigida and related flies from the genus Coelopa are known to feed, mate, and create habitats out of different species of Laminaria. This is of particular notice when the Laminaria is stranded on the beach and not when it is submerged under seawater. With increasing amounts of seaweed washing up on shores, there is an increasing recognition of Laminaria and their close pairing with Coelopa.

Species 

Laminaria abyssalis A.B. Joly & E.C. Oliveira – South American Atlantic
Laminaria agardhii Kjellman – North American Atlantic 
Laminaria appressirhiza J. E. Petrov & V. B. Vozzhinskaya 
Laminaria brasiliensis A. B. Loly & E. C. Oliveira
Laminaria brongardiana Postels & Ruprecht 
Laminaria bulbosa J. V. Lamouroux
Laminaria bullata Kjellman
Laminaria complanata (Setchell & N. L. Garder) Muenscher
Laminaria digitata (Hudson) J. V. Lamouroux
Laminaria ephemera Setchell – Pacific of North America: From Vancouver to California 
Laminaria farlowii Setchell – Coast of the North American Pacific 
Laminaria groenlandica – British Columbia
Laminaria hyperborea (Gunnerus) Foslie – Northeast Atlantic, Baltic Sea and North Sea.
Laminaria inclinatorhiza J. Petrov & V. Vozzhinskaya
Laminaria longipes Bory de Saint-Vincent, 1826
Laminaria multiplicata J. Petrov & M. Suchovejeva
Laminaria nigripes J. Agardh
Laminaria ochroleuca Bachelot de la Pylaie
Laminaria pallida Greville – South Africa,  Indian Ocean, Canary Islands and Tristán da Cunha 
Laminaria platymeris Bachelot de la Pylaie
Laminaria rodriguezii Barnet
Laminaria ruprechtii (Areschoug) Setchell
Laminaria sachalinensis (Miyabe) Miyabe
Laminaria setchellii P. C. Silva
Laminaria sinclairii (Harvey ex J. D. Hooker & Harvey) Farlow, Anderson & Eaton – North American Pacific coast 
Laminaria solidungula J. Agardh
Laminaria yezoensis Miyabe

References

External links
 Laminaria at AlgaeBase

Laminariaceae
Marine biota of Asia
Marine biota of Europe
Marine biota of North America
Biota of the Mediterranean Sea
Flora of the Pacific
Laminariales genera